Chesterfield Street is a "virtually intact" Georgian street (except for No. 6, which is a reconstruction) in London's Mayfair district. Several of the buildings are Grade II listed on the National Heritage List for England.

Location
Chesterfield Street runs south to north from Curzon Street to Charles Street.

History

It is named after Philip Stanhope, 4th Earl of Chesterfield, and bounded the grounds to the east of what was Chesterfield House.

Notable buildings
The gentleman's club White's was founded at No. 4 in 1693; in 1778 it moved to 37–38 St James's Street.

The High Commission of The Bahamas is at No. 10.

The individual listed buildings on Chesterfield Street are 1,
2, 10, 11, 14, and 15. 8 and 9 and 12 and 13 Chesterfield Street are listed in pairs.

Notable residents

Notable residents have included Beau Brummell, the Earl of Dundonald and the Indian businessman Neeraj Kanwar.

Sir Rodney Mundy, Admiral of the Fleet died at his home in Chesterfield Street in 1884.

No. 1, Lord Dudley
No. 1, Herbert Jenner-Fust, judge, died there in 1852.
No. 3, Caroline Norton, social reformer and author
No. 4, Beau Brummell
No. 4, Anthony Eden, prime minister, lived there 1955–57.
No. 4, The Duke of Devonshire lived there in the late 1990s.
No. 6, W. Somerset Maugham, novelist and playwright, lived there 1911–19.
No. 7, Ivy Cavendish-Bentinck, Duchess of Portland
No. 8, Francis Douglas, Viscount Drumlanrig, eldest son of John Douglas, 9th Marquess of Queensberry, was born there.
No. 11, Sir Robert Adair, diplomat

References

External links

Mayfair
Streets in the City of Westminster
Georgian architecture in the City of Westminster
Grade II listed buildings in the City of Westminster
Grade II listed houses in the City of Westminster